Na Fianna CLG is a Gaelic Athletic Association club based in Enfield, County Meath, Ireland. The club plays hurling and football in Meath GAA competitions. Na Fianna CLG currently plays in the Meath Senior Football Championship after winning the Intermediate Championship in 2012. Na Fianna were  SFC finalists in 2013 (in their first year in the senior ranks) and 2015.

Honours
Meath Intermediate Football Championship: 1
 2012
Meath Intermediate Hurling Championship: 1
 2006
Meath Ladies Intermediate Football Championship: 1
 2009
Leinster Junior Club Hurling ChampionshipRunners-up
 2018

Notable players
Conor Downey
Ethan Devine
 Jamie Queeney
 Jack Flynn
 Shane Walsh

References

Gaelic games clubs in County Meath